The Carnon River is a heavily polluted river in Cornwall, United Kingdom. It starts in Chacewater. Trewedna Water and River Kennall flow into the Carnon before it merges with Tallack's Creek to become Restronguet Creek, which eventually flows into the English Channel at the mouth of Carrick Roads.

The Nebra sky disc, a gold-decorated bronze disc found in Germany and dated to the Bronze Age, contains both gold and tin from the Carnon valley.

In 1992 the river was hit by a major pollution incident, when over 45 million litres of contaminated water from the closed Wheal Jane mine was released by the collapse of an adit, colouring the river water red. A treatment works has since been installed at Wheal Jane to intercept the contaminated water and treat it to remove suspended metals and restore a neutral pH.

See also

List of rivers in Cornwall
List of rivers of England

References

External links

Rivers of Cornwall